The name of the Franks (Latin Franci), alongside the derived names of Francia and Franconia (and the adjectives Frankish and Franconian), are derived from the name given to a Germanic tribal confederation which emerged in the 3rd century AD.

The Frankish Empire rose to the main successor of Roman imperial power in Western Europe, and as a result, the Franks ultimately gave their name to both the kingdom of France, and to Franconia, one of the stem duchies of the Holy Roman Empire.

Name and etymology 
The name of the Franks is first attested in Latin as Franci (singular Francus) during the 3rd century AD. The Germanic forms Franchon (Old High German), Francan (Old English) and Frankar ~ Frakkar (Old Norse) point to an original n-stem *Frank-an- or *Frank-on- in the Frankish language.

According to the traditional interpretation, the Franks were named from their national weapon, a kind of spear called the *frankōn (cf. OE franca 'javelin, lance', ON frakka 'javelin, dart'), in a process analogous to the naming of the Saxons, which derives from Proto-Germanic *sahsōn, a small sword similar to a knife or a dagger (cf. OE seax, ON sax, OHG sahs). Alternatively, some scholars have proposed to connect the name to the Proto-Germanic adjective *frankaz, meaning 'fierce, daring, eager to fight' (cf. ON frakkr 'courageous'), which could itself be understood as a nasalized secondary form of *frak(k)az, meaning 'greedy, violent' (cf. ON frǣc, Middle Low German vrak 'voracious, greedy'). In this view, the term *frankōn may simply be interpreted as 'the Frankish [weapon]', or else as an independent derivation from the Germanic root *fram- ('forward'; cf. Latin-Germanic framea 'javelin, spear'). The term francisca, a throwing axe used by the Franks, is an ellipsis of securis francisca, which means 'Frankish ax' in Latin.

By the end of the 6th century AD, the tribal name francus turned into an adjective meaning 'free' in Medieval Latin, presumably because the Franks were exempt from taxation within the territories they had conquered in northern Gaul, or more generally because they possessed there full freedom in contrast to native Gallo-Romance speakers. The English word frank ('free of servitude'; later 'candid, outspoken, unreserved') stems from the Old French franc ('free of servitude'; later also 'noble'), which is itself derived from Medieval Latin francus. By the 17th century AD in the Levant, the term Frank came to designate any contemporary individual from Western Europe, or, by ellipsis, the lingua franca, a Romance-based pidgin language used in the Mediterranean Bassin.

The country name France stems from the Latin Francia (the realm of the Franks), which also gave the term Français (MLat. franciscus; Old French franceis), an endonym designating the French people and language. Between the reigns of John II of France (1360) and Henri IV (1589–1610), then from the Convention (1795) to the adoption of the euro (1999), the franc also served as the currency of France. The term, which may be derived from Francorum Rex ('king of the Franks'), the original motto engraved on coins by the French monarchy, survives today in the name of the Swiss franc, the CFA franc (Western Africa), and the CFP franc (French Pacific).

In a tradition going back to the 7th-century Chronicle of Fredegar, the name of the Franks is taken from Francio, one of the Germanic kings of Sicambri, c. 61 BCE, whose dominion extended all along those lands immediately joining the west bank of the Rhine River, as far as Strasbourg and Belgium. This nation is also explicitly mentioned by Julius Caesar in his Notebooks on the Gallic War (Commentarii de Bello Gallico).

Writing in 2009, Professor Christopher Wickham pointed out that "the word 'Frankish' quickly ceased to have an exclusive ethnic connotation. North of the Loire everyone seems to have been considered a Frank by the mid-seventh century at the latest; Romani were essentially the inhabitants of Aquitaine after that". On the other hand, the formulary of Marculf written about AD 700 described a continuation of national identities within a mixed population when it stated that "all the peoples who dwell [in the official's province], Franks, Romans, Burgundians, and those of other nations, live ... according to their law and their custom."

Francia (France)

The name of France directly continues Latin Francia, originally applied to the entire Frankish Empire.
Under the reign of the Franks' Kings Clovis I, Charles Martel, Pepin the Short, and Charlemagne, the country was known as Kingdom of Franks or Francia. At the Treaty of Verdun in 843, the Frankish Empire was divided in three parts : West Francia (Francia Occidentalis), Middle Francia and East Francia (Francia Orientalis).

The rulers of Francia Orientalis, who soon claimed the imperial title and wanted to reunify the Frankish Empire, dropped the name Francia Orientalis and called their realm the Holy Roman Empire (see History of Germany). The kings of Francia Occidentalis successfully opposed this claim and managed to preserve Francia Occidentalis as an independent kingdom, distinct from the Holy Roman Empire. The Battle of Bouvines in 1214 definitively marked the end of the efforts by the Holy Roman Empire to reunify the old Frankish Empire by conquering France.

Since the name Francia Orientalis had disappeared, there arose the habit to refer to Francia Occidentalis as Francia only, from which the word France is derived. The French state has been in continuous existence since 843 (except for a brief interruption in 885-887), with an unbroken line of heads of states since the first king of Francia Occidentalis (Charles the Bald) to the current president of the French Republic. Noticeably, in German, France is still called Frankreich, which literally means "Reich (realm) of the Franks". In order to distinguish it from the Frankish Empire of Charlemagne, France is called Frankreich, while the Frankish Empire is called Frankenreich.

In most of the Germanic languages, France is known as the historical "Land of the Franks", for example Frankreich (Reich of the Franks) in German, Frankrijk (Rijk of the Franks) in Dutch, Frankrike (Rike of the Franks) in Swedish and Norwegian, and Frankrig in Danish.

In a more restricted meaning, "France" refers specifically to the province of Île-de-France (with Paris at its centre), which historically was the heart of the royal demesne. This meaning is found in some geographic names, such as French Brie (Brie française) and French Vexin (Vexin français). French Brie, the area where the famous Brie cheese is produced, is the part of Brie that was annexed to the royal demesne, as opposed to Champagne Brie (Brie champenoise) which was annexed by Champagne. Likewise, French Vexin was the part of Vexin inside Île-de-France, as opposed to Norman Vexin (Vexin normand) which was inside Normandy.

This meaning is also found in the name of the French language (langue française), whose literal meaning is "language of Île-de-France". It is not until the 19th and 20th centuries that the language of Île-de-France indeed became the language of the whole country France. In modern French, the French language is called le français, while the old language of Île-de-France is called by the name applied to it according to a 19th-century theory on the origin of the French language - le francien.

Franconia

Franconia became the Latin name of East Francia, derived from the German name Franken "realm of the Franks",
Franconia was introduced as a synonym of Francia orientalis by the 12th century (Annalista Saxo),
and came to be used of the Duchy of Franconia as it stood during the 9th and 10th centuries, divided Franconia during the later medieval period, and the Franconian Circle of the early modern period.

Franconian vs. Frankish

The division made between Franconia and Francia for German and French territories of the former Frankish Empire leads to terminological difficulties in English.

English has the two adjectives Franconian and Frankish translating what in Dutch and German is expressed by a single adjective (frankisch and fränkisch, respectively).
Franconian translates German fränkisch when referring to the Franconia within the Holy Roman Empire from the 10th century onward, while Frankish tends to refer to the period of the unified Frankish realm, during the 5th to 9th centuries.

But there are exceptions, most notably in the context of linguistics, where the term Franconian languages translates German  fränkische Sprachen, French Langues franciques.
This group of dialects has a complicated history due to the geographical spread of the High German consonant shift as it developed during the medieval period.
Dutch remained unaffected by the consonant shift 
while Central and Rhenish and High Franconian form a dialect continuum within High German.

Since these dialects are all derived from the early medieval language of the Franks, linguistic terminology in English varies between the names "Frankish" and "Franconian", the Germanic language of Merowingian Francia being variously known as "Old Frankish", "Old Franconian" or simply "Frankish".

Old Franconian
The German term altfränkisch as it was introduced in the mid 19th century did not refer to the early medieval period, but was used as a nostalgic term for "old-timey" Franconia (compare Old English vs. Olde England).
This was rendered into English as "Old Franconian", with 19th-century sources talking about Old Franconian towns, songs, people, etc.
But the same term altfränkisch came to be used of the Frankish language of the Merovingian period.

Gustave Solling's Diutiska (1863) used the adjective "Franconian" in reference to the Merowingian period, and "Old Franconian" for the language of the Pledge of Charles the Bald.

In 1890 Ernest Adams defined "Old Franconian" as an Old High German dialect spoken on the middle and upper Rhine; i.e., it went beyond the limits of Franconia to comprise also the dialect continuum of the Rhineland.

In 1862 Max Müller pointed out that Jacob Grimm had applied the concept of "German" grammar to ten languages, which "all appear to have once been one and the same."
One of these was the "Netherland Language, which appears to have been produced by the combined action of the older Franconian and Saxon, and stands therefore in close relation to the Low German and the Friesian. Its descendants now are the Flemish in Belgium and Dutch in Holland." Müller, after describing Grimm's innovation of the old, middle and new phases of High German, contradicts himself by reiterating that Franconian was a dialect of the upper Rhine.

Low Franconian vs. Dutch

The overlapping concepts of "Franconian" and the division of German into High German and Low German dialects by the 1880s gave rise to the term "Low Franconian" for the 
"Franconian" dialects that did not take part in the High German consonant shift.

Strong and Meyer (1886) defined Low Franconian as the language "spoken on the lower Rhine." Their presentation included an Upper, Middle and Lower Franconian, essentially the modern scheme.

According to  Strong and Meyer, "Franconian ceases to be applied to this language; it is then called Netherlandish (Dutch)…." Only the English ever applied Franconian anywhere; moreover, Netherlandish had been in use since the 17th century, after which Dutch was an entirely English word. The error had been corrected by the time of Wright's Old High German Primer two years later, in 1888. Wright identifies Old Low Franconian with Old Dutch, both terms used only in English.

Van Vliet and his 17th century contemporaries inherited the name and the concept "Teutonic". Teutones and Teutoni are names from Late Latin referring to the West Germanic speaking populations, originally derived from the earlier name of a tribe specifically called Teutons. The word Teutonicus had thus been used since the Middle Ages as an alternative to Theodiscus (the Germanic word from which Dutch and Deutsch evolved).

Between "Old Dutch" (meaning the earliest Dutch language) and "Old Teutonic", Van Vliet inserted "Frankish", the language of the Old Franks. He was unintentionally ambiguous about who these "Old Franks" were linguistically. At one point in his writing they were referred to as "Old High German" speakers, at another, "Old Dutch" speakers, and at another "Old French" speakers. Moreover, he hypothesized at one point that Frankish was a reflection of Gothic. The language of the literary fragments available to him was not clearly identified. Van Vliet was searching for a group he thought of as the "Old Franks", which to him included everyone from Mainz to the mouth of the Rhine.

By the end of the 17th century the concept of Old Frankish, the ancestor language of Dutch, German, and the Frankish words in Old French had been firmly established. After the death of Junius, a contemporary of Van Vliet, Johann Georg Graevius said of him in 1694 that he collected fragments of vetere Francica, "Old Frankish," ad illustrandam linguam patriam, "for the elucidation of the mother tongue." The concept of the Dutch vetere Francica, a language spoken by the Franks mentioned in Gregory of Tours and of the Carolingian Dynasty, which at one end of its spectrum became Old Dutch, and at the other, Old High German, threw a shadow into neighboring England, even though the word "Franconian", covering the same material, was already firmly in use there. The shadow remains.

The term "Old Frankish" in English is vague and analogous, referring either to language or to other aspects of culture. In the most general sense, "old" means "not the present", and "Frankish" means anything claimed to be related to the Franks from any time period. The term "Old Frankish" has been used of manners, architecture, style, custom, government, writing and other aspects of culture, with little consistency. In a recent history of the Germanic people, Ozment used it to mean the Carolingian and all preceding governments and states calling themselves Franks through the death of the last admittedly Frankish king, Conrad I of Germany, in 919, and his replacement by a Saxon. This "Old Frankish" period, then, beginning in the Proto-Germanic period and lasting until the 10th century, is meant to include Old High German, Old Dutch and the language that split to form Low German and High German.

A second term in use by Van Vliet was oud Duijts, "Old Dutch", where Duijts meant "the entire Continental Germanic continuum". The terms Nederlandsch and Nederduijts were coming into use for contemporary Dutch. Van Vliet used the oud Duijts ambiguously to mean sometimes Francks, sometimes Old Dutch, and sometimes Middle Dutch, perhaps because the terms were not yet firm in his mind. Duijts had been in general use until about 1580 to refer to the Dutch language, but subsequently was replaced by Nederduytsch.

English linguists lost no time in bringing Van Vliet's oud Duijts into English as "Old Dutch". The linguistic noun "Old Dutch", however, competed with the adjective "Old Dutch", meaning an earlier writing in the same Dutch, such as an old Dutch rhyme, or an old Dutch proverb. For example, Brandt's "old Dutch proverb", in the English of his translator, John Childe, mentioned in 1721: Eendracht maekt macht, en twist verquist, "Unity gives strength, and Discord weakness," means contemporary Dutch and not Old Dutch. On the frontispiece, Childe refers to the language in which the book was written as "the original Low Dutch". Linguistic "Old Dutch" had already become "Low Dutch", the contemporary language, and "High Dutch", or High German. On the other hand, "Old Dutch" was a popular English adjective used in the 18th century with reference to people, places and things.

See also
 Name of the Goths

References

Bibliography 

Franks
Ethnonyms
Frankish people